Licensed commercial banks in Namibia :

 Bank Windhoek Limited
 First National Bank Namibia Limited
 Nedbank Namibia Limited
 Standard Bank Namibia Limited
 Trustco Bank Namibia Limited
 Banco Atlantico
 Bank BIC Namibia Limited
 Letshego Bank Namibia Limited

EBank, a bank with electronic presence but no branches, operated between 2015 and 2017. It is now part of FNB.

See also
 List of banks in Africa
 Economy of Namibia

References

External links
 Bank PHB Granted Provisional License
 Bank PHB Provisional License Withdrawn

 
Banks
Namibia
Namibia